Corey Ray Mock (born February 17, 1985) is a Democratic-NPL member of the North Dakota House of Representatives who has served in the legislature since 2008 representing both District 42 is in northern Grand Forks and includes the University of North Dakota and District 17 which covers downtown Grand Forks.

Biography 
Mock was born and raised in Minot, North Dakota, where he graduated from Minot High School in 2003. He attended the University of North Dakota in Grand Forks, where he graduated with a degree in history with an emphasis in geography, and is pursuing postgraduate work in community and urban development. From 2001 to 2008, Mock was a Northstar Hobby Stock and IMCA Stock Car racer, and he won the Governor's Cup in 2003.

Career 
Mock became known in the 2009 legislative session for his fight to create an independent redistricting commission. He worked with colleagues on both sides of the aisle to reduce transportation costs for state travel, freeze tuition increases for North Dakota college students, and implement tax cuts. Mock was also a leading voice in the fight to end discrimination in housing, employment and financial assistance based on sexual orientation and gender identity, and in changing the law to allow fire stations to be permitted safe havens for abandoned infants. In the legislature, he serves on the education and political subdivision committees of the legislative assembly.

In October 2015, a speech Mock gave criticizing a loophole in North Dakota's campaign finance laws that allows candidates to keep leftover campaign funds for their personal use was featured on Last Week Tonight with John Oliver.

In addition to his work as a state legislator, Mock served as the Executive Director of the Third Street Clinic, a nonprofit free clinic that provides access to health care services for low-income residents of Grand Forks and Polk counties. He is a member of North Dakota Farmers Union, Rotary International, GF/EGF Chamber of Commerce, Young Professionals, Sons of Norway, and is a volunteer at the Circle of Friends Humane Society. Mock also serves on the Board of Directors of North Dakota Leadership Seminar, and has been a staff member of American Legion Boys State since 2003.

References

External links
 Official campaign website
 Corey Mock in the North Dakota Legislative Assembly

1985 births
21st-century American politicians
Living people
People from Minot, North Dakota
Politicians from Grand Forks, North Dakota
University of North Dakota alumni
Democratic Party members of the North Dakota House of Representatives